Delavan is a city in Tazewell County, Illinois, United States. Its population was 1,689 in the 2010 census. It is a part of the Peoria, Illinois Metropolitan Statistical Area.

History
Delavan was founded by a group of settlers from New England. The city derives its name from Edward C. Delavan, a temperance advocate from Albany, New York. A post office has been in operation at Delavan since 1840.

Geography

Demographics

As of the census of 2000, there were 1,825 people, 705 households, and 516 families residing in the city. The racial makeup of the city was 98.36% White, 0.44% African American, 0.16% Asian, 0.16% from other races, and 0.88% from two or more races. Hispanic or Latino of any race were 0.44% of the population. There were no Pacific Islanders or Native Americans.

There were 705 households, out of which 31.9% had children under the age of 18 living with them, 63.5% were married couples living together, 6.8% had a female householder with no husband present, and 26.7% were non-families. 24.7% of all households were made up of individuals, and 13.2% had someone living alone who was 65 years of age or older. The average household size was 2.59 and the average family size was 3.06.

In the city, the population was spread out, with 27% under the age of 18, 7.7% from 18 to 24, 27.2% from 25 to 44, 22.7% from 45 to 64, and 15.4% who were 65 years of age or older. The median age was 38 years. For every 100 females, there were 93.9 males. For every 100 females age 18 and over, there were 93.6 males.

The median income for a household in the city was $39,063, and the median income for a family was $46,250. Males had a median income of $36,685 versus $21,435 for females. The per capita income for the city was $18,734. 5.7% of the population and 4.2% of families were below the poverty line. 5% of those under the age of 18 and 7.5% of those 65 and older were living below the poverty line.

Education
Delavan has a consolidated public schools district (#703) which educates pre-school through high school students in different areas of a common campus environment.

Notable people
John T. Culbertson, Jr., Illinois Supreme Court justice
Archibald H. Sunderland, U.S. Army major general
Julia Thecla, artist

References

External links

City of Delavan Website
Delavan School District Website

Cities in Illinois
Cities in Tazewell County, Illinois
Peoria metropolitan area, Illinois
1837 establishments in Illinois
populated places established in 1837